Villaines-sous-Lucé (literally Villaines under Lucé) is a commune in the Sarthe department in the region of Pays de la Loire in north-western France.

Notable people born in Villaines-sous-Lucé 
 Augustin-Joseph de Mailly (1707–1794), French aristocrat, royalist general and governor

See also
Communes of the Sarthe department

References

Communes of Sarthe